The Bosnia and Herzegovina national under-17 football team is made up by players who are 17 years old or younger and represents Bosnia and Herzegovina in international football matches at this age level. It is controlled by the Football Association of Bosnia and Herzegovina.

Competitive record

UEFA European Under-17 Championship record

*Denotes draws include knockout matches decided on penalty kicks.

2022/2023 UEFA European U17 Qualifiers

Group 2

Group 1

Recent results and forthcoming fixtures

2022

Personnel

Current technical staff

Coaching history

Current squad
The following players were called up for 2023 UEFA European U17 Elite Round between 15 and 17 February 2023.
Caps and goals correct as of 17 February 2023 after the game against Albania.

Recent call-ups
The following eligible players have been called up for the team within the last twelve months:

 PRE

 PRE

 PRE

INJ Withdrawn due to injury.
PRE Preliminary squad.
SUS Suspended.
WD Withdrew.

See also 
 UEFA European Under-17 Championship
 Bosnia and Herzegovina men's national football team
 Bosnia and Herzegovina men's national under-21 football team
 Bosnia and Herzegovina men's national under-19 football team
 Bosnia and Herzegovina men's national under-18 football team
 Bosnia and Herzegovina men's national under-15 football team
 Bosnia and Herzegovina women's national football team
 Bosnia and Herzegovina women's national under-19 football team
 Bosnia and Herzegovina women's national under-17 football team

External links
UEFA Under-17 website Contains full results archive

European national under-17 association football teams
Bosnia and Herzegovina national youth football teams